Grebo-Krahn National Park, Grebo-Krahn National Forest, Grebo National Park, Grebo National Forest, or Grebo Forest is a national park in Grand Gedeh County and River Gee County, Liberia controlled by Liberia's Forestry Development Authority. This national park contains over 300 animal species, 270 plant species and serves as an important habitat for endangered and critically endangered species and subspecies, most notably the Western Chimpanzee, Diana Monkey, King Colobus, Pygmy Hippopotamus and Giant Pangolin

References 

Forests of Liberia
Nature conservation in Liberia
Grand Gedeh County